Frederik Nielsen and Aisam-ul-Haq Qureshi, who were the defending champions, chose to not play this year.
Andis Juška and Alexandre Kudryavtsev defeated Alexey Kedryuk and Junn Mitsuhashi 6–4, 7–6(6) in the final.

Seeds

Draw

Finals

References
 Doubles draw

Doubles